Statistics of Liberian Premier League for the 2006 season.

Overview
It was contested by 9 teams, and Mighty Barrolle won the championship.

League standings

References
Liberia - List of final tables (RSSSF)

Football competitions in Liberia
Lea